Goh Assembly constituency is an assembly constituency for Bihar Legislative Assembly in Aurangabad district, Bihar. It comes under Karakat (Lok Sabha constituency).

Members of Legislative Assembly

Election results

2020

References

External links
 

Assembly constituencies of Bihar